The Estadio Fiscal Antonio Rispoli Diaz is a stadium located in Punta Arenas, Chile. It has a capacity for 4,500 spectators.

Sports venues in Chile
Buildings and structures in Punta Arenas
Buildings and structures in Magallanes Region